Villa Aurora is a building in Los Angeles, California.

Villa Aurora may also refer to:

 Casino di Villa Boncompagni Ludovisi, also known as Villa Aurora, a building in Rome

See also 
 Vila Aurora, a train station in São Paulo
 Villa Aurore, a novel by J. M. G. Le Clézio